In mathematics, the soul theorem is a theorem of Riemannian geometry that largely reduces the study of complete manifolds of non-negative sectional curvature to that of the compact case. Jeff Cheeger and Detlef Gromoll proved the theorem in 1972 by generalizing a 1969 result of Gromoll and Wolfgang Meyer. The related soul conjecture, formulated by Cheeger and Gromoll at that time, was proved twenty years later by Grigori Perelman.

Soul theorem
Cheeger and Gromoll's soul theorem states:

By the Gauss equation and total geodesicity, the induced Riemannian metric on the soul automatically has nonnegative sectional curvature. Gromoll and Meyer had earlier studied the case of positive sectional curvature, where they showed that a soul is given by a single point, and hence that  is diffeomorphic to Euclidean space.

This mapping is known as the Sharafutdinov's retraction.

Cheeger and Gromoll also posed a converse question of whether there is a complete Riemannian metric of nonnegative sectional curvature on the total space of any vector bundle over closed manifolds of positive sectional curvature.

Examples.
 As can be directly seen from the definition, every compact manifold is its own soul. For this reason, the theorem is often stated only for non-compact manifolds.
 As a very simple example, take  to be Euclidean space .
 Now take the paraboloid }, with the metric  being the ordinary Euclidean distance coming from the embedding of the paraboloid in Euclidean space . Here the sectional curvature is positive everywhere, though not constant.
 One can also consider an infinite cylinder }, again with the induced Euclidean metric. The sectional curvature is  everywhere. Non-horizontal cross sections of the cylinder are not souls since they are neither totally convex nor totally geodesic.

Soul conjecture
As mentioned above, Gromoll and Meyer proved that if  has positive sectional curvature then the soul is a point. Cheeger and Gromoll conjectured that this would hold even if  had nonnegative sectional curvature, with positivity only required of all sectional curvatures at a single point. This soul conjecture was proved by Grigori Perelman, who established the more powerful fact that Sharafutdinov's retraction is a Riemannian submersion, and even a submetry.

References

Sources.

Theorems in Riemannian geometry